"Rock! Rock! (Till You Drop)" is a track by English hard rock band Def Leppard from their 1983 album, Pyromania. An edited version was released as a single in Mexico that same year.

History
The history of "Rock! Rock! (Till You Drop)" predates the Pyromania recording sessions by a few years. Def Leppard first played a song by the title "Medicine Man" on their first UK headlining tour in April 1980. "Medicine Man", which appears in its original form twice as live tracks on the band's 2020 box set The Early Years 79–81, contains the main guitar parts and structure of "Rock! Rock! (Till You Drop)." The song was rewritten to include new rhythm and lyrics, and a solo by Def Leppard's newest band member Phil Collen, to debut as the opening track on the 1983 multi-platinum Pyromania. Though not released as a single in major markets, the song was released as a single in Mexico, and a music video was released. The song is one of the few non-singles to appear in many live sets, most recently played as an opener on the 2015 World Tour. The song also appears as the opening track of the second discs of the compilation albums Best Of and Rock of Ages.

Music video
The music video for the song was shot in January 1984 in Japan during the Pyromania World Tour. The video appears on Historia, though not further video compilations released by the band.

Track listing

References

Songs about rock music
Def Leppard songs
1983 songs
Songs written by Steve Clark
Songs written by Rick Savage
Songs written by Robert John "Mutt" Lange
Songs written by Joe Elliott
Song recordings produced by Robert John "Mutt" Lange